Mathematical Q models provide a model of the earth's response to seismic waves. In reflection seismology, the anelastic attenuation factor, often expressed as seismic quality factor or Q, which is inversely proportional to attenuation factor, quantifies the effects of anelastic attenuation on the  seismic wavelet caused by fluid movement and grain boundary friction. When a plane wave propagates through a homogeneous viscoelastic medium, the effects of amplitude attenuation and velocity dispersion may be combined conveniently into the single dimensionless parameter, Q. As a seismic wave propagates through a medium, the  elastic energy associated with the wave is gradually absorbed by the medium, eventually ending up as heat energy.  This is known as absorption (or anelastic attenuation) and will eventually cause the total disappearance of the seismic wave.

The frequency-dependent attenuation of seismic waves leads to decreased resolution of seismic images with depth. Transmission losses may also occur due to friction or fluid movement, and for a given physical mechanism, they can be conveniently described with an empirical formulation where elastic moduli and propagation velocity are complex functions of frequency. Bjørn Ursin and Tommy Toverud  published an article where they compared different Q models.

Basics
In order to compare the different models they considered plane-wave propagation in a homogeneous viscoelastic medium. They used the Kolsky–Futterman model as a reference and studied several other models. These other models were compared with the behavior of the Kolsky–Futterman model.

The Kolsky–Futterman model was first described in the article ‘Dispersive body waves’ by Futterman (1962).

'Seismic inverse Q-filtering' by Yanghua Wang (2008) contains an outline discussing the theory of Futterman, beginning with the wave equation:

where U(r,w) is the plane wave of radial frequency w at travel distance r, k is the wavenumber and i is the imaginary unit. Reflection seismograms record the reflection wave along the propagation path r from the source to reflector and back to the surface.

Equation (1.1) has an analytical solution given by:

where k is the wave number. When the wave propagates in inhomogeneous seismic media the propagation constant k must be a complex value that includes not only an imaginary part, the frequency-dependent attenuation coefficient, but also a real part, the dispersive wave number. We can call this K(w) a propagation constant in line with Futterman.

k(w) can be linked to the phase velocity of the wave with the formula:

Kolsky's attenuation-dispersion model

To obtain a solution that can be applied to seismic k(w) must be connected to a function that represents the way in which U(r,w)  propagates in the seismic media. This function can be regarded as a Q-model.

In his outline Wang calls the Kolsky–Futterman model the Kolsky model. The model assumes the attenuation α(w) to be strictly linear with frequency over the range of measurement:

And defines the phase velocity as:

where cr and Qr are the phase velocity and the Q value at a reference frequency wr.

For a large value of Qr >> 1 the solution (1.6) can be approximated to

where

Kolsky’s model was derived from and fit well with experimental observations. The theory for materials satisfying the linear attenuation assumption requires that the reference frequency wr is a finite (arbitrarily small but nonzero) cut-off on the absorption. According to Kolsky, we are free to choose wr following the phenomenological criterion that it be small compared with the lowest measured frequency w in the frequency band. More information regarding this concept can be found in Futterman (1962)

Computations
For each of the Q models Ursin B. and Toverud T. presented in their article they computed the attenuation (1.5) and phase velocity (1.6) in the frequency band 0–300 Hz. Fig.1. presents the graph for the Kolsky model – attenuation (left) and phase velocity (right) with cr = 2000 m/s, Qr = 100 and wr = 2100 Hz.

Q models

Wang listed the different Q models that Ursin B. and Toverud T. applied in their study, classifying the models into two groups. The first group consists of models 1-5 below, the other group including models 6-8. The main difference between these two groups is the behaviour of the phase velocity when the frequency approaches zero. Whereas the first group has a zero-valued phase velocity, the second group has a finite, nonzero phase velocity.

1) the Kolsky model (linear attenuation)

2) the Strick–Azimi model (power-law attenuation)

3) the Kjartansson model (constant Q)

4) Azimi's second and third models (non-linear attenuation)

5) Müller's model (power-law Q)

6) Standard linear solid Q model for attenuation and dispersion the Zener model (the standard linear solid)

7) the Cole–Cole model (a general linear-solid)

8) a new general linear model

Notes

References

External links
Some aspects of seismic inverse Q-filtering theory by Knut Sørsdal

Seismology measurement
Geophysics